Miloš Kopecký   (22 August 1922 in Prague – 16 February 1996 in Prague) was a Czech actor, active mainly in the second half of the 20th century.

Biography 
He was born into the family of a furrier; his mother was a hatter. From childhood he was involved with the theatre and music, and after some unsuccessful attempts to study, he chose the career of an actor. He began to appear on the stage in 1939, as a member of an amateur elocution group. During the German occupation of Czechoslovakia he performed with a collective of young artists, Tvar (The Shape). At the end of the Second World War, he was (having one Jewish parent) interned in the labor camp in Bystřice u Benešova. His mother was murdered in the Auschwitz concentration camp. Following the liberation, he took up a career as a professional actor in the avant-garde studio Větrník (from 1945 to 1946), and afterward he was engaged in many Prague theatre scenes. A few years later, he also began to appear in films and gradually became one of the most popular actors in Czechoslovakia. In the mid-1980s Kopecký acted in a politically biased documentary film about emigrants, but, on the other side, he presented a very critical speech against the communist régime in May 1987, at the Fourth Congress of Dramatic Artists. He was married five times, once with Czech actress Stella Zázvorková. For many years Kopecký suffered from manic-depressive disease, partially caused by the death of his mother, who perished in a concentration camp.

Theatre 
Following his engagement in Větrník he appeared in various theatre scenes:
Divadlo satiry (1946–47)
Studio Národního divadla (1947–48)
Realistické divadlo (1948–49)
Národní divadlo (1949–50)
Městská divadla pražská (1950–51)
Armádní umělecké divadlo (1951–54)
Divadlo estrády a satiry (1954–55)
Divadlo satiry (1955–59)
Divadlo ABC (1957–60)
Hudební divadlo v Karlíně (1964–65)

A turning point in his career came in 1965, when the director František Pavlíček engaged him to the Divadlo na Vinohradech, to which he remained faithful throughout the rest of his life. Nonetheless, he acted as a guest also in other theatres, e.g. in Semafor Theatre, or in Divadlo ABC (ABC Theatre), where he cooperated with another important actor of the time, Jan Werich. Among his most valued roles were Paolino in Pirandello's The Man, The Beast and The Virtue, Professor Higgins in G. B. Shaw's Pygmalion, Harpagon in Molière's The Miser, and many others.

Film 
Kopecký was a passionate admirer of film from an early age, and began to appear on screen shortly after the war. His first minor role was in the historic film Jan Roháč z Dubé (1947), but he quickly graduated to more important characters. During his career he played mainly negative roles of bon vivants, elegant intriguers, traitors, debauchees, lechers and villains, which he managed to depict with great elegance and esprit. Among his most valued roles in film were Chaplain Katz in The Good Soldier Švejk (1956), Hogofogo in Limonádový Joe (1964), the chief of the Czech water-goblins in Jak utopit dr. Mráčka aneb Konec vodníků v Čechách (1974), the villainous Count von Kratzmar in Adéla ještě nevečeřela (1977), and many others. He may be best known today as Dr. Štrosmajer in the Czech television series Nemocnice na kraji města.

Selected filmography 

1947: Jan Rohác z Dube - 
Student*1947: Nevíte o bytě? - Komisar
1948: Az se vrátís - Soused
1949: Návrat domù
1949:  - Vinárník
1949: Revolucni rok 1848 - Komorník u Portheima
1950: Daleká cesta - Prisoner building a gas chamber #1
1951: Posel úsvitu - Doctor Held
1952: The Emperor and the Golem - Alchemist 2
1952: Mikolás Ales
1952: The Proud Princess - Chancellor
1952: Velké dobrodruzství - Cecil Rhodes
1953: Únos - Rychman
1953: Anna Proletářka - Komisar
1953: Tajemství krve - Lékar na prednásce
1954: Kavárna na hlavní tríde - Matejka, redaktor
1954: Olovený chléb - Policejní komisar
1954: Severní prístav - Berka
1954: Cirkus bude! - klaun Tonda
1954: Nejlepší člověk - lekárník Valérian Kýla
1955: Byl jednou jeden král - Smart prince
1955: Dog's Heads - Kos, správce
1955: Jan Hus - Biskupský Kanclér
1956: Jan Žižka - Sir from Sternberk
1956: Větrná hora - Melichar Hnátek
1956: Stříbrný vítr - Gerlic, nadporucík
1957: Dědeček automobil - Albert de Dion
1957: Legenda o lásce - Prodavachat na kilimi
1957: The Good Soldier Schweik - Katz, feldkurát
1958: Stenata - Magistrate
1958: Mezi zemí a nebem - Leopold
1959: O věcech nadpřirozených - Graphologist Jensen (segment "The Secret of a Handwriting")
1959: Hvězda jede na jih - Soustek - tourist guide
1959: Občan Brych - Kamil Tajchman
1959: Sny na nedeli - pacient Voves, Jindruv kamarád
1960: Zpívající pudrenka - Krásný Venca
1960: Konec cesty - Jirák
1960: Vstup zakázán - Saboteur (segment "The Chase") (voice)
1961: Cirkus jede - Klaun Mrskoc
1961: The Fabulous Baron Munchausen - Emil Tuma / Emil Tuma Sr.
1962: Man in Outer Space - Josef, calouník
1962: Kolik slov stací lásce? - Frantisek Habrada
1962: The Fabulous Baron Munchausen - Baron Munchausen
1962: Dva z onoho sveta - Psychiatr
1962: Kočár nejsvětější svátosti (TV Movie) - secretary Martinez
1963: The King of Kings - Izmail el Sarif ben Serfi
1964: Lemonade Joe - Horác Badman Alias 'hogofogo'
1965: Lov na mamuta - Doktor
1965: Bílá paní - Tajemník MNV
1966: U telefonu Martin - Havrda
1966: Flám - Jirí Donát
1967:  - Muz za novinami
1967: Ta nase písnicka ceská - Johanes
1967: Kdyz má svátek Dominika - Nácelník detektivu
1967: Sedm žen Alfonse Karáska (TV Movie) - Alfons Karásek
1968: Přísně tajné premiéry - Müller
1968: Objízdka - Narrator (voice)
1969: Prazske noci - Fabricius (segment "Fabricius and Zuzana")
1969: Slasti Otce vlasti - Jan Lucemburský
1969: Já, truchlivý bůh - Adolf
1969: Trapasy (TV Short) - Milos Kopecký
1970: Four Murders Are Enough, Darling
1970: I Killed Einstein, Gentlemen - Wertheim
1971: You Are a Widow, Sir - Professor Somr, majítel sanatoria
1971: Svatby pana Voka - Petr Vok z Rozmberka
1971: Vražda v hotelu Excelsior - Arno Hnízdo, reditel hotelu
1971: The Tricky Game of Love - Francesco Vergellesi (segment "Arabský kun")
1971: Svět otevřený náhodám - Rataj
1971: Alfons Karásek v lázních (TV Short) - Alfons Karásek
1972: Straw Hat - Maurice Fadinard
1972: Sest medvedu s Cibulkou - Svihák
1972: Lakomec (TV Movie) - Harpagon 
1973: A Night at Karlstein - Duke Stepan of Bavaria
1974: Jak utopit doktora Mráčka aneb Konec vodníků v Čechách - Wassermann
1976: Zítra to roztočíme, drahoušku…! - Evzen Novák
1976: To byla svatba, strýčku! (TV Movie) - Alfons Karásek
1977: Nemocnice na kraji města (TV Series)
1977: Nás dedek Josef - Baron
1978: Dinner for Adele - Rupert von Kratzmar
1979: Já už budu hodný, dědečku! - herec Theodor Bergner
1979: Božská Ema - cechoamerikan Herold Samuel
1980: Causa králík - Dr. Oldrich Lukásek
1980: Jak napálit advokáta - JUDr. Horic
1980: Úteky domu - MUDr. Karel Chrástek
1980: V hlavni roli Oldrich Novy - Himself
1981: Zakázaný výlet - Klavírista
1981: Zralé víno - Weber
1981: The Mysterious Castle in the Carpathians - Baron Gorc z Gorcu
1981: Křtiny - Ing. Ciruvka
1983: Srdečný pozdrav ze zeměkoule - Prof. Horowitz
1983: Zbohom, sladké driemoty - Director
1983: Angel in a Devil's Body - sekcní séf min. financí Boura
1984: Tři veteráni - 1. Skritek
1984: Tajna starog tavana - Boss
1984: Bambinot (TV Series) - Mitropulos
1984: Prodloužený čas - Prof. Svozil
1984:  - Self - entertainer
1986: Carovné dedictví - Vetesník
1986: Zkrocení zlého muže - Bayer
1986: Velká filmová loupez - Dr. Strosmajer
1986: Spanelská paradentóza - Onkel Tobias
1987: Poslední leč Alfonse Karáska (TV Movie) - Alfons Karásek
1988: Anděl svádí ďábla - Minister
1989: Utopím si ho sám (TV Movie) - Choun
1991: Labyrinth - Rabbi Löw
1991:  - Giacomo Casanova
1992: La valle di pietra - Giudice Escher
1992: Uctivá poklona, pane Kohn (TV Mini-Series) - Munk
1993: Kanarska spojka - Don Padre
1994: Andelské oci - Krause
1995: The Dance Teacher - Grandfather of Richard
1996: Das Zauberbuch - Regent

References

Further reading 
Co za to stálo  (1993, with Milan Hein)
Já: soukromý život Miloše Kopeckého  (1996, with Pavel Kovář)
Miloš Kopecký: důvěrný portrét  (1999, Pavel Kovář in cooperation with Jana Kopecká)

External links 

Miloš Kopecký at the CSFD 

1922 births
1996 deaths
Male actors from Prague
Czech Jews
Czech male stage actors
Czech male film actors
Czech male television actors
Jewish male actors
20th-century Czech male actors
Czechoslovak male actors